8187 Akiramisawa, provisional designation , is an Eos asteroid from the outer region of the asteroid belt. It was discovered by Japanese astronomer Satoru Otomo at Kiyosato Observatory  on 15 December 1992. It was named after Japanese botanist Akira Misawa (1942–1994).

Orbit and classification 

Akiramisawa is a member the Eos family, the largest asteroid family of the outer main belt consisting of nearly 10,000 known members. It orbits the Sun in the outer asteroid belt at a distance of 2.6–3.4 AU once every 5 years and 2 months (1,886 days). Its orbit has an eccentricity of 0.12 and an inclination of 12° with respect to the ecliptic.

Naming 

This minor planet was named in honour of Japanese botanist Akira Misawa (1942–1994), a professor at Chiba University , who examined the effects of light pollution on plants. The  was published by the Minor Planet Center on 9 January 2001.

Physical characteristics 

A rotational lightcurve of Akiramisawa was obtained from photometric observations made at the Palomar Transient Factory in June 2010. Lightcurve analysis gave a rotation period of  hours with a high brightness amplitude of 0.90 magnitude. The Collaborative Asteroid Lightcurve Link assumes a standard albedo for carbonaceous asteroids of 0.057, and calculates a diameter of 11.9 kilometers with an absolute magnitude of 13.36.

References

External links 
 Lightcurve Database Query (LCDB), at www.minorplanet.info
 Dictionary of Minor Planet Names, Google books
 Asteroids and comets rotation curves, CdR – Geneva Observatory, Raoul Behrend
 Discovery Circumstances: Numbered Minor Planets (5001)-(10000) – Minor Planet Center
 
 

008187
Discoveries by Satoru Otomo
Named minor planets
19921215